Saranac Lake Union Depot is a former New York Central Railroad station in Saranac Lake, New York. It was built in 1904 by the Delaware and Hudson Railway. In its heyday, the station served several daily trains going north to Malone, New York, on to Montreal, Quebec, and south to Utica, New York and Grand Central Terminal in New York City. Passenger coaches went direct from New York City to Saranac Lake until late 1952 or early 1953.  Direct sleeping cars from trains such as North Star and then Iroquois continued as late as 1964 to the station. Tourist trains were operated on the 8-mile sector between Saranac Lake and Lake Placid by the Adirondack Railroad between 2000 and 2016. The tracks were removed in 2022 to enable construction of a rail-trail between Lake Placid and Tupper Lake, to be completed in 2024.

On April 24, 1965 the NYC ran its final train on the Adirondack Division route through Saranac Lake Union Depot to Utica Union Station. 
The station houses historic exhibits, a visitors center and gift shops, During its heyday, the station handled eighteen to twenty scheduled passenger trains per day.

See also
New York Central Railroad Adirondack Division Historic District
Historic Saranac Lake

References

Former New York Central Railroad stations
Former Delaware and Hudson Railway stations
Union stations in the United States
Tourist attractions in Franklin County, New York
Railway stations in the United States opened in 1904
Railway stations closed in 1972
1904 establishments in New York (state)
1972 establishments in New York (state)